Charles Hay, MBE (23 April 1930 – 4 August 2017) was a Scottish curler and World Champion. He skipped the Scottish team that won the 1967 World Curling Championships, known then as the Scotch Cup. The other members of the Scottish team were John Bryden, Alan Glen and Dave Howie. They defeated Sweden in the final. Scotland did not win another men's world title until 1991 when David Smith's rink (including Chuck's eldest son David) beat Canada in Winnipeg.

Hay was made an MBE in 1977 for his promotion of curling. In 2011, he received the Elmer Freytag Award for services to curling and was inducted into the World Curling Federation Hall of Fame in 2012.

Hay worked as a farmer in Perthshire.

Teams

References

External links 
 

1930 births
2017 deaths
Scottish male curlers
World curling champions
Members of the Order of the British Empire
Scottish curling champions
Scottish farmers
People from Perthshire